Marjaana Väre (born 10 January 1967, in Helsinki) is a Paralympian athlete from Finland competing as a swimmer and in the category F42-46 javelin events. She won a gold medal

Career 
Väre has competed in 4 Paralympics in two different sports.  She first competed in 1992 in Barcelona in various swimming events but failed to win any medals.  It was the same story in Atlanta in 1996.  After missing the 2000 games she returned in 2004 in the Athletics events and won a gold medal in the F42-46 javelin as well as competing in the discus.  Four years later, however she was unable to defend her title coming away with nothing from the F42-46 javelin.

References

External links
 profile on paralympic.org

1967 births
Athletes from Helsinki
Paralympic athletes of Finland
Paralympic swimmers of Finland
Swimmers at the 1992 Summer Paralympics
Swimmers at the 1996 Summer Paralympics
Athletes (track and field) at the 2004 Summer Paralympics
Athletes (track and field) at the 2008 Summer Paralympics
Paralympic gold medalists for Finland
Finnish female swimmers
Living people
Finnish female shot putters
Finnish female javelin throwers
Medalists at the 2004 Summer Paralympics
Paralympic medalists in athletics (track and field)
20th-century Finnish people
21st-century Finnish people